In Greek mythology, Opites (Ancient Greek: Ὀπίτην) was an Achaean warrior who participated in the Trojan War. He was slain by the Trojan hero Hector during the siege of Troy.

Note

References 

 Homer, The Iliad with an English Translation by A.T. Murray, Ph.D. in two volumes. Cambridge, MA., Harvard University Press; London, William Heinemann, Ltd. 1924. . Online version at the Perseus Digital Library.
 Homer, Homeri Opera in five volumes. Oxford, Oxford University Press. 1920. . Greek text available at the Perseus Digital Library.

Achaeans (Homer)